Highsplint is a former coal town with an extinct post office in Harlan County, Kentucky, United States. It was named for the High Splint and Seagraves Coal Companies which operated a mine in the town at that time. Highsplint's first post office was established on February 7, 1918, with John D. Casey as postmaster, remaining in operation until 1974.

References

External links
Picture of Highsplint during the 1940s

Unincorporated communities in Harlan County, Kentucky
Unincorporated communities in Kentucky
Company towns in Kentucky
Populated places established in 1918
Coal towns in Kentucky